Pentaerythritol is an organic compound with the formula C(CH2OH)4. Classified as a polyol, it is a white solid. Pentaerythritol is a building block for the synthesis and production of explosives, plastics, paints, appliances, cosmetics, and many other commercial products.

The word pentaerythritol is a blend of penta- in reference to its 5 carbon atoms and erythritol, which also possesses 4 alcohol groups.

Synthesis
Pentaerythritol was first reported in 1891 by German chemist Bernhard Tollens and his student P. Wigand. It may be prepared via a base-catalyzed multiple-addition reaction between acetaldehyde and 3 equivalents of formaldehyde to give pentaerythrose (CAS: 3818-32-4), followed by a Cannizzaro reaction with a fourth equivalent of formaldehyde to give the final product.

Uses
Pentaerythritol is a versatile building block for the preparation of many compounds, particularly polyfunctionalized derivatives. applications include alkyd resins, varnishes, polyvinyl chloride stabilizers, tall oil esters, antioxidants (e.g. Anox 20). Such derivatives are found in plastics, paints, cosmetics, and many other products. 

Esters of pentaerythitol are biodegradable, and they are used as transformer oils. Due to a very high flash point they also find some use in lubricating gas turbines.

Polyester derivatives
Pentaerythritol is a precursor to esters of the type C(CH2OX)4. Such derivatives are pentaerythritol tetranitrate (PETN),  a vasodilator and explosive, the trinitrate derivative pentrinitrol (Petrin), the tetraacetate normosterol (PAG), and the polymer cross-linking agent pentaerythritol tetraacrylate.

Fire retardants
Pentaerythritol is used as a fire retardant, such as in plastics and intumescent paints and coatings. It releases water upon heating and leaves a deposit of thermally insulating char.

See also
 Neopentyl glycol
 Trimethylolethane
 Trimethylolpropane

References

Tetrols